Ishrat Hashmi was a Pakistani actress. Ishrat acted in numerous television dramas. She was known for her roles in dramas in Dhoop Kinare, Ana, Shehzori and Uncle Urfi.

Early life
Ishrat was born in 1948 in Karachi, Pakistan. She completed her studies from University of Karachi. She started working at Radio Pakistan in Lahore in 1959.

Career
She made her debut as an actress on PTV in 1970s. She was noted for her roles in dramas Shama, Afshan, Aroosa and Naukar Ke Aage Chakar. She also appeared in dramas Family 93, Ba Adab, Ba Mulahiza, Khala Khairan, Zeenat, Zair, Zabar, Pesh and Tipu Sultan: The Tiger Lord. Since then she appeared in dramas Shehzori, Aakhri Chattan, Kya Bane Baat, Burger Family, Ana, Bahadur Ali and Dhoop Kinare. In 1973 she also appeared in movie Naam Kay Nawab. In 2005, Tributes were paid to her at the 1st Indus Drama Awards in Karachi by television personalities including Moin Akhter, Adnan Siddiqui, Faysal Qureshi, Sultana Siddiqui, Humayun Saeed and Babra Sharif.

Personal life
Ishrat was married and had six children a daughter named Khursheed Talat, a son named Ikbal,a daughter named Anjum, a son named sohail, and two daughters called shella and Farah . Ishrat later in 2000s, she left television and migrated abroad with her family to America. In 2004 she returned back.

Death
Ishrat Hashmi died on 31 January 2005 in Karachi.

Filmography

Television

Telefilm

Film

References

External links
 

1948 births
20th-century Pakistani actresses
2005 deaths
Pakistani television actresses
21st-century Pakistani actresses
Pakistani film actresses